St. Ignatius Hospital is a former manor hospital located in Colfax, Washington, United States, established in 1892 by the Sisters of Providence.

History
St. Ignatius Hospital was built in 1892 by the Sisters of Providence, from Montreal. The hospital was in operation until 1964, when it was shut down after the opening of  Whitman Community Hospital. The property served as an assisted living home until 2000. In 2003, the building was officially shut down and abandoned.

In 2015, the hospital was opened for public tours, based on claims that the site is haunted. According to a 2017 report, the tours earned over $30,000 between 2015 and 2016, the proceeds of which go to the Colfax Chamber of Commerce.

In early 2021 the hospital was purchased yet again. The new owners are working on partially renovating the hospital for tours. The date of reopening is yet to be determined.

In popular culture
The hospital was featured in an episode of the television series Paranormal Lockdown in 2017.

The paranormal reality television Ghost Adventures covered the story of the St. Ignatius Hospital, in the episode "St. Ignatius Hospital".

In 2022, the hospital was featured in an episode of the web series Ghost Files on the YouTube channel Watcher by content creators Ryan Bergara, Shane Madej and Garrett Watts.

References

External links

Photo album of St. Ignatius Hospital via Washington State Trust

1892 establishments in Washington (state)
1964 disestablishments in Washington (state)
2000 disestablishments in Washington (state)
Buildings and structures in Whitman County, Washington
Defunct hospitals in Washington (state)
Reportedly haunted locations in Washington (state)